St. Paul is a town in Collin County, Texas, United States. The population was 1,066 at the 2010 census, up from 630 at the 2000 census.

Geography
It is bordered to the west, south, and east by the city of Wylie. The city of Lucas is to the north.

Demographics

As of the 2020 United States census, there were 992 people, 239 households, and 201 families residing in the town.

References

External links
 Town of St. Paul official website

Towns in Collin County, Texas
Towns in Texas
Dallas–Fort Worth metroplex